Filip Kutev, often anglicized Philip Koutev (13 June 1903 – 27 November 1982), was a Bulgarian composer, arranger and founder, with his wife Maria Kuteva, in 1951, of Bulgaria's first professional, state supported ensemble, the
State Ensemble for Folk Song and Dance, also known as the Filip Kutev Ensemble. With his ensemble he pioneered a style of arranging folk songs by fusing folk elements with western classical forms and harmonies, and established a new Bulgarian choral tradition.

His choir was one of four who appeared on the album Le Mystère des Voix Bulgares, Volume Two, which won a Grammy Award in 1989.

He was born in Aytos, Burgas Province.

Honours
Kutev Peak in Antarctica is named after Filip Kutev.

References

External links
  (in Bulgarian)

1903 births
1982 deaths
Bulgarian composers
Bulgarian folklorists
Bulgarian musicologists
People from Aytos
20th-century composers
20th-century musicologists